Scott Oudsema (born July 1, 1986) is a former professional tennis player from the United States.

Career
Oudsema partnered Phillip Simmonds to win the doubles at the 2002 Orange Bowl. He also competed with Simmonds at the 2003 Australian Open and the pair won the boys' doubles title. In 2004, Oudsema won a further three junior Grand Slam tournaments, the Australian Open, Wimbledon Championships and US Open, all with Brendan Evans. In the only Grand Slam the pair didn't win, the French Open, they were semi-finalists. Also in 2004, before a large home-town crowd, Oudsema lost in the USTA Boys 18 singles finals to Scoville Jenkins.

On the men's tour, Oudsema competed in the doubles at the US Open four times, but only once made the second round, in 2005 with Alex Kuznetsov. His only singles win at ATP Tour level came in the 2006 Countrywide Classic, where he defeated Benjamin Becker in the opening round, before losing to Andy Roddick. He won three ATP Challenger tournaments during his career, one in singles and two in doubles.

In the summer of 2009, Oudsema along with coach Murphy Jensen, Olga Puchkova, Leander Paes, Rennae Stubbs, and Nadia Petrova, led the Washington Kastles, to its first World Team Tennis title. He was the 2009 WTT Finals MVP. He retired in 2009.

Junior Grand Slam finals

Doubles: 4 (4 titles)

ATP Challenger and ITF Futures finals

Singles: 5 (1–4)

Doubles: 12 (6–6)

Performance timeline

Singles

References

1986 births
Living people
American male tennis players
Tennis people from Michigan
Australian Open (tennis) junior champions
Wimbledon junior champions
US Open (tennis) junior champions
Grand Slam (tennis) champions in boys' doubles